Abdul Khader Nadakattin (born 1953) is a grassroots agricultural innovator, a social worker and an environmentalist from Dharwad in the Indian state of Karnataka. He is  credited with more than 40 innovations that assist small and marginal farmers. His famous innovations include a tamarind seed separation device, a ploughing blade making machine, a seed cum fertilizer drill, a water-heating boiler, an automatic sugarcane sowing driller, and a wheel tiller. In the year 2022, Govt of India honoured Abdul Khader Nadakattin by conferring the Padma Shri award for his contributions in the field of grassroots innovation.

Early life and education
Abdul Khader Nadakattin was born in 1953 in Annigeri in Dharwad district in Karnataka as the only son of a wealthy farmer and had his formal education only up to the Standard X. He wanted to continue his studies but his father insisted that he discontinue his formal education and turn to agricultural activities.

First innovation 

Nadakattin's first invention was a "Water Alarm" which he developed while still studying in school. He developed this device to help get up from bed early in the mornings. He used to sleep late into the morning. He tied a thin rope knotted to the end of the alarm key in a timepiece to a bottle of water in such way that after the ringing of the alarm water would fall on his face.

Innovations related to tamarind 

Abdul Khadar Nadakattin had inherited about 60 acres of land from his father. The land was dry, rain was unpredictable and groundwater very scarce. Abdul Khadar Nadakattin decided to try alternatives to traditional practices. He started planting seedlings of mango trees, sapota trees and ber trees with chilli as an intercrop in a part of his land. But due to lack of sufficient water, the idea failed miserably as all the seedlings dried out and dead. Nadakattin did not give up and turned to planting tamarind trees in large numbers. He had observed that the tamarind trees  can survive even in severe dry conditions.  This turned out to be a turning point in his life. With much difficulty he could plant around 1600 tamarind plants and with proper care all of them survived. Inspired by the success of this experiment,  he planted 1,100 more tamarind plants. Growing tamarind with scarce but alkaline water was an innovation in itself. 

Enthused by the initial success, Nadakattin took a series steps to expand and strengthen the practices. He dug ponds to harvest rain water, constructed underground tanks to preserve tamarind pulp and started manufacturing value added products from tamarind like pickle and jam. These products were marketed even in cities like Hyderabad. But he soon realized that the production of these value added products is labor intensive and he conceived the idea of inventing machines which would help reduce dependence on human labor. This led to the development of several devices that could help processing of tamarind. The first such device was one to separate tamarind seeds. The device had a system wherein due to the sliding action of the pegs that were tapered at the end, the seed gets thrown out of the tamarind pod. Another one was a device for slicing tamarind for making pickles. Due to his craze for tamarind related work, local people even named him as hunase huccha, which means "tamarind maniac".

Other innovations 
The many other innovations spearheaded by Nadakattin include:

A new kind of bullock drawn tiller capable of deep ploughing
A machine for sharpening the tractor harrow blade
A machine for sowing seeds of different sizes ensuring proper spacing
Water-heating boiler: It could heat enough water for bathing 20 people by using five kg of wood chips in about ten minutes. The device can keep the water hot for nearly 24 hours.
Automatic sugarcane sowing driller

Establishment of a company 

In 1975, Nadakattin established a company named Vishwashanthi Agricultural Research and Industrial Research Centre in Annigeri, Dharwad to manufacture and market the agricultural equipments developed by him.

Recognitions

In the year 2022, Govt of India conferred the Padma Shri award, the third highest award in the Padma series of awards, on  Abdul Khader Nadakattin for his distinguished service in the field of grass root innovation. The award is in recognition of his service as a "Grassroots agricultural innovator from Dharwad, credited with over 40 innovations that assist small and marginal farmers across India."
Lifetime Achievement Award during the National Innovation Foundation-India’s 8th National Grassroots Innovation and Outstanding Traditional Knowledge Awards (2015)

See also
Padma Shri Award recipients in the year 2022

References

External links
Website of Vishwashanthi Agriculture Research And Industrial Development Centre, a company established by Abdul Khader Nadakattin in 1975 to manufacture and market his innovative products.

Indian inventors
People in agriculture
Recipients of the Padma Shri in other fields
1953 births
Living people